Fernand Mermoud (20 August 1913 – 9 June 1940) was a French cross-country skier. He competed in the men's 18 kilometre event at the 1936 Winter Olympics. He was killed during the Second World War.

Personal life
Mermoud served in the 6th Battalion, chasseurs alpins during the Second World War. He was killed in action in Evreux, Normandy, during the Battle of France on 9 June 1940.

References

1913 births
1940 deaths
French male cross-country skiers
Olympic cross-country skiers of France
Cross-country skiers at the 1936 Winter Olympics
French Army personnel of World War II
French military personnel killed in World War II
People from Chamonix
Sportspeople from Haute-Savoie
20th-century French people